Steve Frank (born 14 April 1965) is a Guyanese boxer. He competed in the men's featherweight event at the 1984 Summer Olympics.

References

1965 births
Living people
Guyanese male boxers
Olympic boxers of Guyana
Boxers at the 1984 Summer Olympics
Place of birth missing (living people)
Featherweight boxers